Mahmoud Ansari Qomi Preachers and scholars in Tehran.

Life and education 
His famous scholars in Tehran and Abu al-Qasim al-Khoei in Najaf and representative and Sayyid Ruhollah Khomeini in Iran. He was born in about 1921 in a family in Qom. Lost his father at age ten and under the tutelage of his brothers, initial lessons learned. Mahmoud Ansari in young individuals to study in Najaf and the area was great training.

Professors 
He trained under masters such as:
 Syed Abdul Hadi Shirazi
 Muhsin al-Hakim
 Abu al-Qasim al-Khoei
 Mohammad-Reza Golpaygani
 Ahmad Khonsari
 Ruhollah Khomeini
 Agha Bozorg Tehrani
 Shahab al-Din Mar'ashi Najafi

In The Islamic Revolution 
His movement and arrest Ruhollah Khomeini Islamic Revolution in 1963, had an important role in encouraging and cheer Najaf scholars. Around 1964 he moved to Tehran and religious and social activities and charity payments.

Social service 
Mahmoud Ansari Along with the establishment of dozens of mosques and two hospitals, On the way to resolve the problems of the people showed their great efforts and would spare no effort in this way. Mahmoud Ansari was reliable and trustworthy Many clerics and some of them, the baptism and his burial was entrusted to them.

Death 
He died on 12 March 1999 at the age of seventy-seven, and after the funeral, was buried in the Sheikhan cemetery in Qom.

References 

People from Qom
Iranian writers
Iranian Shia scholars of Islam
Iranian Shia clerics
Burials at Sheikhan cemetery